Snowy Mountains Highway is a  state highway located in New South Wales, Australia. Its two sections connect the New South Wales South Coast to the Monaro region, and the Monaro to the South West Slopes via the Snowy Mountains. The higher altitude regions of this road are subject to snow over the winter months, and the road also provides access to many parts of the Snowy Mountains Scheme. The highway bears the B72 shield along its entire length.

The highway originally bore the name Monaro Highway until 1958, when it received its current name. Part of the roadway was reallocated to what is now known as Monaro Highway in 1955. Reservoirs created as a result of dams built in the 1950s and 1960s as part of the Snowy Mountains Scheme required the creation of major realignments to avoid submerged areas. Previous to New South Wales' conversion to alphanumeric route markers, it was signed as National Route 18.

Route description

It heads roughly west through hilly terrain, the terrain smooths eventually and the road crosses the Bemboka River at Morans Crossing. A short distance further the road passes through Bemboka, taking on the name Loftus Street within the urban area. West of Bemboka the road follows the southern bank of the Bemboka River, before crossing the Nunnock River near its confluence with the Bemboka River at the base of the Great Dividing Range escarpment. Up until this point the immediate landscape surrounding the road has so far consisted of farmland. At the top of the range the road then enters Glenbog State Forest before once again traversing farmland for a short distance until it meets the Monaro Highway at Steeple Flat, south of Nimmitabel. This intersection is a T-intersection, through traffic continues north along Monaro Highway, while traffic heading to the south from either direction must turn. To reach the western section of Snowy Mountains Highway, Monaro Highway must be taken north towards Cooma at this point.

The western section begins at the Bombala and Sharp Street roundabout in Cooma. The highway takes on the name Sharp Street from this intersection as it heads west within Cooma urban area. Here the road meets a T-intersection, with through traffic taking Kosciuszko Road southwest towards Jindabyne. The highway turns to continue on its westerly heading. The roadway then makes its way through undulating terrain for some distance before it passes through Adaminaby, and on into Kosciuszko National Park. The park boundary is marked by a sign, there are no park entry gates on the highway, and park entry fees are not payable. The landscape becomes open grassland at this point and remains relatively flat as the road continues relatively gently up an alpine valley created by the Eucumbene River and its numerous tributaries. At the top of the valley the road reaches its highest point a little below . The road then descends into part of a similar valley created by the Murrumbidgee River as it passes by the access roads for Yarrangobilly Caves. Continuing on, the roadway passes by Jounama Dam and then roughly parallels the eastern side of Blowering Reservoir (created by Blowering Dam further downstream).

From here the highway then crosses the Tumut River and heads into the town of Tumut itself, taking on the names Blowering Street, Fitzroy Street, and Adelong Street within the urban area. West of Tumut the road crosses a large valley created by Gilmore Creek and Deep Creek, before a small climb through Adelong Gap into the town of Adelong, taking on the names Tumut Street, Inglis Street, and Lynch Street within the urban area. Beyond Adelong, the road continues northeast through undulating terrain before crossing Hillas Creek and then following it for the last few kilometres until the highway's western terminus at Hume Highway, located roughly halfway between Gundagai and Tarcutta.

High altitude sections subject to snow and ice have yellow lane markings and red reflector posts (which are sometimes double or triple height); in contrast to the white lines and posts generally seen elsewhere around Australia. It is recommended that snow chains are carried for all two-wheel drive vehicles travelling on this highway within Kosciuszko National Park during the winter months.

History

The passing of the Main Roads Act of 1924 through the Parliament of New South Wales provided for the declaration of Main Roads, roads partially funded by the State government through the Main Roads Board (later the Department of Main Roads, and eventually Transport for NSW). Monaro Highway was declared (as Main Road No. 4) on 8 August 1928, heading northwest from Tathra, via Bega, Nimmitabel, Cooma, Adaminaby, Tumut, Adelong, and Lower Tarcutta to Wagga Wagga. With the passing of the Main Roads (Amendment) Act of 1929 to provide for additional declarations of State Highways and Trunk Roads, this was amended to State Highway 4 on 8 April 1929. 

The Department of Main Roads, which had succeeded the MRB in the previous year, proclaimed the portion of the highway between Wagga Wagga and Hume Highway at Lower Tarcutta to be part of Sturt Highway on 8 August 1933; the highway's western end was truncated at its own junction with Hume Highway near Hillas Creek instead.

When the Snowy Mountains Scheme commenced in 1949, the road began to increase in importance. Roadworks to increase the standard of the road were undertaken, and were often paid for by the Snowy Mountains
Hydro-Electric Authority. In 1955, it was decided that what was still then known as Monaro Highway would be renamed as Snowy Mountains Highway. This was done as only a relatively small portion of the road was actually within the Monaro region. The various roads classified as State Highway 19, were then named as Monaro Highway in 1958. In contrast with Snowy Mountains Highway, the entire length of that highway is within the Monaro region.

Over the years further changes to the alignment have occurred. The eastern section of the highway no longer runs west to Nimmitabel, instead meeting Monaro Highway to the south; the old section has been renamed as Old Bega Road. The western section has also seen some major changes with the highway being realigned to avoid Lake Eucumbene near Adaminaby due to the construction of Eucumbene Dam in the 1950s. Similarly realignment was required to avoid the Jounama Pondage and Blowering Reservoir near  due to the construction of Jounama and Blowering Dams in the 1960s.

The passing of the Roads Act of 1993 through the Parliament of New South Wales updated road classifications and the way they could be declared within New South Wales. Under this act, the eastern end of the highway was truncated to the intersection with Princes Highway at Stony Creek north of Bega on 24 May 1996; the former section from Bega to Tathra was renamed as Tathra Road. Snowy Mountains Highway today retains its declaration as Highway 4, from the intersection with Princes Highway at Stony Creek to the intersection with Monaro Highway south of Nimmitabel, and from Cooma to the intersection with Hume Highway near Hillas Creek in Mount Adrah.

Route markers

Route markers were first introduced in Australia in late 1954. Over the following decades they were progressively rolled out to the various highways around the nation, under a nationwide route numbering scheme,  with the highway allocated National Route 18 across its entire length in 1955. In addition to this, the section of Monaro Highway between Cooma and Steeple Flat was also signed as National Route 18 in addition to the National Route 23 route marker used along the remainder of its length within NSW; this kind of arrangement is known as a duplex or concurrency. This allowed one route to cover the highway from end to end. With the conversion to the newer alphanumeric system in 2013, this was replaced with route B72. The concurrency along Monaro Highway remains intact with B72 used in addition to B23 between Cooma and Steeple Flat.

Junction list

See also

 Highways in Australia
 Highways in New South Wales

References

 
Highways in New South Wales